This is the list of episodes for Late Night with Seth Meyers in 2023.

2023

January

February

March

References

External links
 
 Lineups at Interbridge 

Episodes
Lists of American non-fiction television series episodes
Lists of variety television series episodes